The seventh competition weekend of the 2012–13 ISU Speed Skating World Cup was held in the Eisstadion Inzell in Inzell, Germany, from Saturday, 9 February, until Sunday, 10 February 2013.

Schedule of events
Schedule of the event:

Medal summary

Men's events

Women's events

References

7
Isu World Cup, 2012-13, 7
Sports competitions in Bavaria